César Eduardo González Amais (born 1 October 1982 in Maturín) is a Venezuelan football midfielder. He currently plays for Atlético Venezuela.

González started his career in 2002 with Monagas Sport Club, in 2004 he moved to Colombia to play for Atlético Huila and then in 2005 he moved to Deportivo Cali also in Colombia, where he was part of the 2005 championship winning squad.

In 2005, he returned to Venezuela to play for Caracas FC where he won two Primera División titles.

In 2007, he was selected to represent Venezuela at the Copa América 2007 and after the tournament he was signed by Argentine club Colón de Santa Fe.

In 2008, he joined Club Atlético Huracán where he was part of the team that finished as runners up in the Clausura 2009 tournament. During the winter transfer he joined Mexican side San Luis Potosí.

In 2011, he has left San Luis de Mexico to join Argentine club Gimnasia y Esgrima La Plata. After six month, he joined River Plate on a loan deal for six months, with an option to buy of around $500,000. After the season ended, River Plate decided not to redeem the option to buy on his contract. On 15 July 2012, Maestrico González signed a three-year contract with Venezuelan football club Deportivo Táchira.

International career
Cesar González has played 56 matches with the national football team of Venezuela, scoring five goals in them.  On 9 July 2011, Gonzalez scored from 30 yards against Ecuador in the Copa America to put Venezuela on the verge of qualification to the quarter finals.

International goals

|-
| 1. || 24 March 2007 || Metropolitano de Mérida, Mérida, Venezuela ||  || 3–1 || 3–1 || Friendly
|-
| 2. || 3 March 2010 || Metropolitano de Lara, Lara, Venezuela ||  || 1–2 || 1–2 || Friendly
|-
| 3. || 9 July 2011 || Padre Ernesto Martearena, Salta, Argentina ||  || 1–0 || 1–0 || 2011 Copa América
|-
| 4. || 22 May 2013 || Metropolitano de Mérida, Mérida, Venezuela ||  || 1–1 || 2–1 || Friendly
|-
| 5. || 10 September 2013 || Estadio José Antonio Anzoátegui, Puerto La Cruz, Venezuela ||  || 2–1 || 3–2 || 2014 World Cup qualifier 
|}

Titles

References

External links
 Argentine Primera statistics at Fútbol XXI  
 
 

1982 births
Living people
People from Maturín
People from Monagas
Venezuelan footballers
Venezuela international footballers
Venezuelan expatriate footballers
Association football midfielders
Caracas FC players
Deportivo Cali footballers
Atlético Huila footballers
Monagas S.C. players
San Luis F.C. players
Club Atlético Huracán footballers
Club Atlético Colón footballers
Deportivo Táchira F.C. players
Coritiba Foot Ball Club players
Club Atlético River Plate footballers
Venezuelan Primera División players
Argentine Primera División players
Liga MX players
Campeonato Brasileiro Série A players
Categoría Primera A players
Expatriate footballers in Argentina
Expatriate footballers in Brazil
Expatriate footballers in Mexico
Expatriate footballers in Colombia
Venezuelan expatriate sportspeople in Argentina
Venezuelan expatriate sportspeople in Brazil
Venezuelan expatriate sportspeople in Mexico
Venezuelan expatriate sportspeople in Colombia
2007 Copa América players
2011 Copa América players
2015 Copa América players